is a science museum located in Kōfu, Yamanashi Prefecture, Japan. The museum specializes in astronomy, and technology.

History  
The museum was originally located at Kofu Castle but was moved to its present location in 1998 when reconstruction of Kofu Castle began.

Facilities 
The museum includes a planetarium, astronomical observatory dome, exhibition room, experience study room, and a library. The museum is located approximately 25 minutes walk from north exit of Kōfu Station.

References  
Yamanashi Science Museum  

Science museums in Japan
Museums in Yamanashi Prefecture
Museums established in 1998
1998 establishments in Japan
Astronomical observatories in Japan
Planetaria in Japan
Kōfu, Yamanashi